Kiss the Sky is a 1998 drama film directed by Roger Young. The plot follows two men in their forties and friends since college who take a business trip to the Philippines. There they examine their lives and consider trading their adult responsibilities for a return to the hedonism of their youth. The film was shot in the locations of Manila, Taal Lake, and Batangas.

Plot
Jeff and Marty are two friends and businessmen facing a midlife crisis. Jeff is married to Franny and has two daughters, while Marty is married to Beth. Both men feel something is missing in their marriages. The men decide to travel to the Philippines, where they embark on a drug and alcohol-fueled bender and meet Andy, whom both men fall in love with. They have a threesome and decide to leave their families to live together. Andy introduces them to Kozen, a Zen Buddhist monk, and they decide to build a refuge on an isolated beach. After a period together, Jeff misses his family and the relationship of the group deteriorates when Andy falls in love with Jeff.

Cast

Reception 
Nathan Rabin of The A.V. Club called the film "Little more than The Beach for the mortgage-and-carpool crowd," and said it "starts strong only to become an escapist fantasy for overaged Maxim readers." Rabin noted the threesome scene between the three leads is "an excruciating [one] that suggests a Playboy video recast with veteran character actors. The movie never really recovers, as the quest for spiritual salvation mutates into an extremely ordinary battle of the sexes."

References

External links

Kiss the Sky at AllMovie

1999 films
Films directed by Roger Young
1999 romantic drama films
Films scored by Patrick Williams
Films set in the Philippines
American romantic drama films
Metro-Goldwyn-Mayer films
Films shot in the Philippines
Midlife crisis films
1990s English-language films
1990s American films
Films about threesomes
Films about vacationing